The Rogerenes (also known as the Rogerens Quakers or Rogerines) were a religious sect founded in 1674 by John Rogers (1648–1721) in New London, Connecticut. Rogers was imprisoned and spent some years there. He was influenced by the Seventh Day Baptists and the Religious Society of Friends (Quakers) and opposed the established Puritan church. 

Rogerenes initially held to a Seventh Day (Saturday) Sabbath, but over the years began to regard each day as equally holy. Their disdain for Sunday worship often brought them into sharp conflict with their neighbors. Increasingly, they adopted, a pacifist stance, including war tax resistance, which further brought them the ridicule of the larger community. 

Some of the Rogerenes left Connecticut and migrated to New Jersey. settling in parts of present-day Morris County. One such group settled in what is now the Landing section of Roxbury Township, New Jersey near Lake Rogerine, known as Mountain Pond in about 1700. Another, smaller group of Rogerenes in about 1734 settled on the eastern side of Schooley's Mountain near present-day Hackettstown, New Jersey.

Rogerene worship services continued through the early 20th century in Connecticut.

References

Further reading

1674 establishments in Connecticut
Religious organizations established in the 1670s
Connecticut Colony
Christianity in Connecticut